Fabrício Ramos Melo (born June 13, 1986) is a Brazilian footballer who plays for Águia de Marabá.

References

1986 births
Living people
Brazilian footballers
Brazilian expatriate footballers
Brazilian expatriate sportspeople in Turkey
Association football midfielders
Paysandu Sport Club players
Sertãozinho Futebol Clube players
Associação Desportiva Cabofriense players
Bursaspor footballers
Boavista Sport Club players
Águia de Marabá Futebol Clube players
Associação Atlética Anapolina players
Paragominas Futebol Clube players
Independente Futebol Clube players
Tuna Luso Brasileira players
Clube do Remo players